Max Simeoni (born 28 August 1929 in Lozzi) is a Corsican physician and politician. He was a Member of the European Parliament (MEP) from 1989 to 1994.

He was elected to the European Parliament in 1989 as a candidate of the autonomist Union of the Corsican People on the list of the French Greens led by Antoine Waechter. His parliamentary assistant was François Alfonsi, who became himself MEP in 2009. Like Djida Tazdaït, the other non-Green MEP elected on the list, he refused to abide to the Greens tourniquet rule by which every elected official had to resign at mid-term to prevent the political professionalization. At the next European elections in 1994 he led an autonomist list, Régions et peuples solidaires, which failed to attain the 5% electoral threshold. He later tried unsuccessfully to be a candidate for the 1995 French presidential election. He is the brother of the historical Corsican autonomist leader Edmond Simeoni.

Sources

External links
 Page on the website of the European Parliament

1929 births
Living people
People from Haute-Corse
Corsican politicians
Corsican nationalists
Party of the Corsican Nation politicians
MEPs for France 1989–1994